The 2017 Sacramento Republic FC season is the club's fourth season of existence. The club is playing in the United Soccer League, the second tier of the American soccer pyramid. Sacramento Republic FC is competing in the Western Conference of the USL.

Club

Roster 
As of August 31, 2017.

Technical Staff 
As of July 20, 2017.

Competitions

Preseason

Standings

USL

U.S. Open Cup

Friendlies

Transfers

In

Out

Loan in

References

Sacramento Republic
Sacramento
Sacramento Republic
Sacramento Republic FC seasons